The Shukshin Altai State Humanities Pedagogical University or Shukshin Altai State University for Humanities and Pedagogy is a federal state budget educational institution of higher education in Biysk, Altai Krai.

History
Biysk Teachers' Institute was established in 1939 and became a pedagogical (teachers' training) institute in 1953. In 2000 this institution of higher education received a university status. In 2001 Biysk Pedagogical State University was named after V. M. Shukshin. In 2010 the Shukshin Pedagogical State University of Biysk became the Shukshin Altai State Academy of Education, and got its current name in 2015.

Institutes
 Institute of Humanitarian Education
 Institute of Natural Sciences and Professional Education
 Institute of Pedagogics and Psychology

Notes

External links 
 

Educational institutions established in 1939
Universities and institutes established in the Soviet Union
Universities in Altai Krai
1939 establishments in Russia
Teachers colleges in Russia